Telescopium Herschelii (Latin for Herschel's telescope), also formerly known as Tubus Hershelli Major, is a former constellation in the northern celestial hemisphere. Maximilian Hell established it in 1789 to honour Sir William Herschel's discovery of the planet Uranus. It fell out of use by the end of the 19th century. Psi2 Aurigae at apparent magnitude 4.8 was the constellation's brightest star.

History 
It was one of two constellations created by Maximilian Hell in 1789 to honour the famous English astronomer Sir William Herschel's discovery of the planet Uranus. Named Tubus Hershelli Major by Hell,  it was located in the constellation Auriga near the border to Lynx and Gemini and depicted Herschel's 20-ft-long telescope. Its sibling was Tubus Hershelli Minor, which lay between Orion and Taurus. The two telescopes lay near Zeta Tauri, near where the planet Uranus was first spotted.

Johann Elert Bode renamed the constellation Telescopium Herschelii and omitted the smaller telescope constellation in his 1801 Uranographia  star atlas. In his atlas, the constellation depicted Herschel's earlier 7-foot telescope. It was ignored by some celestial cartographers such as Argelander in 1843, Proctor in 1876, Rosser in 1879 and Pritchard in 1885, yet did appear in two works of the 1890s. However, it was noted by Allen in 1899 that it was becoming obsolete. In 1930, when the official borders of the constellations were drawn up, its stars were absorbed into Auriga, Gemini and Lynx.

Notable features 

Psi2 Aurigae (also known as 50 Aurigae), with an apparent magnitude of 4.8, was the brightest star in the constellation, Bode assigning it the designation 'a'. Located 420 ± 20 light-years distant from earth, it is an orange giant of spectral type K3III. Other stars belonging to the constellation include Psi4, Psi5, Psi7, 63, 64, 65 and 66 Aurigae, and Omicron Geminorum.

Thought to be around 4 billion years old, Psi5 Aurigae is a sunlike star of spectral type G0V that is around 1.07 times as massive as the Sun and 1.18 times as wide. It appears to have a circumstellar disk of dust, known as a debris disk.

See also 

 Telescopium

References

Former constellations